The Financial Review Rich List 2017 is the 34th annual survey of the wealthiest people resident in Australia, published by The Australian Financial Review on 25 May 2017. From its establishment in 1984 and up until the publication of the 2016 list, the survey had been published in either hardcopy and/or online format in the BRW, or formerly, the Business Review Weekly. On 4 March 2016, Fairfax Media announced the closure of the BRW website, and redirected the site to a new section of The Australian Financial Review. Rich lists are now published in The Australian Financial Review Magazine and in 2017 were rebranded as the Financial Review Rich List.

In the 2017 list, the net worth of the wealthiest individual, Anthony Pratt, was 12.60 billion. The combined wealth of the 200 individuals was calculated as 230 billion; compared with a combined wealth of 6.4 billion in 1984 when the BRW Rich 200 commenced. Fifteen women and 185 men made the 2014 list.

List of individuals 

{| class="wikitable"
!colspan="2"|Legend
|-
! Icon
! Description
|-
|
|Has not changed from the previous year's list
|-
|
|Has increased from the previous year's list
|-
|
|Has decreased from the previous year's list
|}

See also
 Financial Review Rich List
 Forbes Asia list of Australians by net worth

References

External links 

2017 in Australia
2017